Priscus Jacob Tarimo (born in Kilimanjaro) is a Tanzanian businessman and politician who was a former Ward Councillor for Kilimanjaro ward and presently serves as a Chama Cha Mapinduzi's Member of Parliament for Moshi Urban Constituency since November 2020. He is also a board member of Moshi Urban Water Supply and Sanitation Authority (MUSWA).

See also 
 Adolf Mkenda
 Irene Tarimo

References

External links 

Living people
Moshi, Tanzania
People from Kilimanjaro Region
Year of birth missing (living people)
University of Dar es Salaam alumni
21st-century Tanzanian politicians
Chama Cha Mapinduzi politicians
Chama Cha Mapinduzi MPs
Tanzanian MPs 2020–2025
Members of the National Assembly (Tanzania)